Alastair David McPhail  (born 2 March 1961) is a British diplomat who was the United Kingdom's first Ambassador to the Republic of South Sudan, appointed in July 2011 when the country gained independence. He had served as consul-general from 16 March 2011. McPhail left South Sudan in March 2013 and was appointed to be British Consul-General in Jerusalem from January 2014. He was replaced in Jerusalem in 2017 and was appointed to be ambassador to the Federal Democratic Republic of Ethiopia from January 2019. He took up the post on 28 January 2019.

McPhail was appointed Officer of the Order of the British Empire (OBE) in the 2005 New Year Honours. He was appointed Companion of the Order of St Michael and St George (CMG) in the 2014 New Year Honours for services to British interests in South Sudan.

References
McPHAIL, Dr Alastair David, Who's Who 2014, A & C Black, 2014; online edn, Oxford University Press, Dec 2013 
Dr Alastair McPhail CMG OBE, gov.uk

External links

1961 births
Living people
University of Otago alumni
Alumni of the University of Edinburgh
Ambassadors of the United Kingdom to South Sudan
Consuls-General of the United Kingdom to Jerusalem
Ambassadors of the United Kingdom to Ethiopia
Companions of the Order of St Michael and St George
Officers of the Order of the British Empire
Permanent Representatives of the United Kingdom to the African Union